División de Honor Femenina de Balonmano or Liga Guerreras Iberdrola after sponsorship of Iberdrola, is the premier women's professional handball league in Spain. It is administered by the Royal Spanish Handball Federation (RFEBM). It was established in 1952, and it is currently contested by twelve teams. 

The 4 last ranked teams are relegated to División de Honor Oro Femenina, league newly created for the 2022-2023 season. For a long time, the 2nd level of the spanish women's handball pyramid was División de Plata (the 3rd level as of now).

Super Amara Bera Bera is the defending champion.

History
The championship was founded in 1953, though it was cancelled in 1955 before it was resumed in 1961. Balonmano Sagunto, formerly known as Medina/Íber/Mar Valencia is the championship's most successful club with 27 titles, having dominated the competition throughout the 1980s and most of the 1990s, while SD Itxako has become its major team in recent years, ending the hegemony of Valencian clubs for the past three decades.

The Spanish leading teams have been fairly successful in international competitions since the 1990s. Mar Valencia won the 1997 Champions League and the 2000 Cup Winners' Cup, while CB Amadeo Tortajada and SD Itxako have won the EHF Cup. In 2011 Itxako and CB Mar Alicante reached the final of the Champions League and the Cup Winners' Cup respectively.

It changed its official name before 2011–12 season to División de Honor Femenina de Balonmano. It was called Liga ABF between 2003 and 2011.

Championship rules
Each team of every division has to play with all the other teams of its division twice, once at home and the other at the opponent's stadium. This means that as its counterparts of Liga ASOBAL, each División de Honor season ends after every team plays 26 matches.

Like many other leagues in continental Europe, the División de Honor takes a winter break once each team has played half its schedule. One unusual feature of the league is that the two halves of the season are played in the same order—that is, the order of each team's first-half fixtures is repeated in the second half of the season, with the only difference being the stadiums used.

Each victory adds 2 points to the team in the league ranking. Each drawn adds 1 point.head-to-head.
At the end of the league, the winner is:
The team that has most points in the ranking.
If two or more teams are level on points, the winner is the team that has the best results
If there is no winner after applying the second rule, then the team with the best overall goal difference wins.

2022-23 season teams (12)

List of champions

 1953 Sección Femenina (Madrid)
 1954 Sección Femenina (Madrid)
 1955 Sección Femenina (Madrid)
 1961 Sección Femenina (Barcelona)
 1962 SH A Coruña
 1963 Medina Barcelona 
 1964 Picadero
 1965 Picadero
 1966 Picadero
 1967 Picadero
 1968 Medina Valencia
 1969 Medina Valencia
 1970 Picadero
 1971 Atlético Madrid
 1972 Atlético Madrid 
 1973 Medina Guipúzcoa
 1974 Medina Valencia
 1975 Medina Guipúzcoa
 1976 Atlético Madrid
 1977 Atlético Madrid
 1978 Atlético Madrid
 1979 Medina-Íber Valencia
 1980 Íber Valencia
 1981 Íber Valencia
 1982 Íber Valencia
 1983 Íber Valencia
 1984 Íber Valencia
 1985 Íber Valencia
 1986 Íber Valencia
 1987 Íber Valencia
 1988 Íber Valencia
 1989 Íber Valencia
 1990 Íber Valencia

 1991 Íber Valencia
 1992 Íber Valencia
 1993 Mar Valencia
 1994 Mar Valencia
 1995 Mar Valencia
 1996 Mar Valencia
 1997 Mar Valencia
 1998 Mar Valencia
 1999 Elda
 2000 Mar Valencia
 2001 Mar Valencia
 2002 Mar Valencia
 2003 Elda
 2004 Elda
 2005 Mar Valencia
 2006 Amadeo Tortajada
 2007 Amadeo Tortajada
 2008 Elda
 2009 Itxako
 2010 Itxako
 2011 Itxako
 2012 Itxako
 2013 Bera Bera
 2014 Bera Bera
 2015 Bera Bera
 2016 Bera Bera
 2017 Mecalia Atl. Guardés
 2018 Bera Bera
 2019 Rocasa Gran Canaria
 2020 Bera Bera
 2021 Bera Bera
 2022 Bera Bera

Performance by club

See also
Copa de la Reina
Supercopa de España

References

External links
 Real Federación Española de Balonmano

 

 
Spain
Women
Hand
Women's handball in Spain
Professional sports leagues in Spain